The Roman Catholic Archdiocese of Santarém is a Latin Church metropolitan archdiocese in northern Brazil. It was a suffragan diocese in the ecclesiastical province of Belém do Pará until 6 November 2019.

Its cathedral episcopal see is Catedral Nossa Senhora da Conceição, dedicated to the Immaculate Conception, in the city of Santarém, Brazil.

History 
 Established on 21 September 1903 as Territorial Prelature of Santarém, with territory split off from the Diocese of Belém do Pará
 Lost territories:
16 August 1934 to establish the Territorial Prelature of Xingu
1 February 1949 to establish the Territorial Prelature of Macapá (later elevated to diocese status)
10 April 1957 to establish the Territorial Prelature of Óbidos (later elevated to diocese status)
 Elevated on 16 October 1979 to Diocese of Santarém
 6 July 1988, lost territory to establish the Territorial Prelature of Itaituba.
 Promoted on 6 November 2019 as Archdiocese of Santarém

Statistics 
As per 2014, it pastorally served 316,500 Catholics (70.2% of 451,000 total) on 171,906 km² in 22 parishes with 53 priests (26 diocesan, 27 religious), 90 lay religious (39 brothers, 51 sisters) and 19 seminarians.

Episcopal ordinaries
Territorial Prelates of Santarém 
 Frederico Benício de Souza e Costa (22 September 1904 – 8 January 1907), next Bishop of Amazonas (Brazil, now Metropolitan Archdiocese of Manaus) (1907.01.08 – 1914.04.16), emeritate as Titular Bishop of Thubunæ in Numidia (1914.04.16 – death 1938.03.26)
 Amando Agostino Bahlmann, Order of Friars Minor (O.F.M.) (born Germany) (10 January 1907 – 5 March 1939), emeritate as  Titular Bishop of Argos (1908.07.10 – death 1939.03.05)
 Apostolic Administrator Father Anselmo Pietrulla, O.F.M. (born Poland) (1941 – 1947.12.13)
 Anselmo Pietrulla, O.F.M. (13 December 1947 – 18 June 1949), Titular Bishop of Conana (1947.12.13 – 1949.06.18); later Apostolic Administrator of Territorial Prelature of Macapá (Brazil) (1949 – 1950.01.14), Bishop of Campina Grande (Brazil) (1949.06.18 – 1955.05.11), Bishop of Tubarão (Brazil) (1955.05.11 – retired 1981.09.17), died 1992
 João Floriano Loewenau, O.F.M. (born Poland) (8 September 1950 – 12 September 1957), Titular Bishop of Drivastum (1950.09.08 – death 1979.06.04), also next as Bishop-Prelate of Óbidos (Brazil) (1957.09.12 – 1972) and on emeritate
 Tiago Miguel Ryan, O.F.M. (born USA) (31 January 1958 – 16 October 1979 see below), Titular Bishop of Margum (1958.01.31 – 1978.05.26)

Suffragan Bishops of Santarém
 Tiago Miguel Ryan, O.F.M. (see above 16 October 1979 – retired 27 November 1985), died 2002
 Lino Vomboemmel, O.F.M. (27 November 1985 – death 28 February 2007); formerly Titular Bishop of Iunca in Byzacena (1981.05.25 – 1983.06.09), first as Auxiliary Bishop of Santarém (1981.05.25 – 1983.06.09) and then as Coadjutor Bishop of Santarém (1983.06.09 – succession 1985.11.27)
 Esmeraldo Barreto de Farias (28 February 2007 – 30 November 2011), previously Bishop of Paulo Afonso (Brazil) (2000.03.22 – 2007.02.28); later Metropolitan Archbishop of Porto Velho (Brazil) (2011.11.30 – 2015.03.18), then Titular Bishop of Summula (2015.03.18 – ...) as Auxiliary Bishop of São Luís do Maranhão (Brazil) (2015.03.18 – ...)
 Flávio Giovenale, S.D.B. (19 September 2012 – 19 September 2018), previously Bishop of Abaetetuba (Brazil) (1997.10.08 – 2012.09.19); appointed Bishop of Cruzeiro do Sul, Acre

Archbishops of Santarém
 Irineu Roman, C.S.I. (6 November 2019 – present)

Other affiliated bishops

Coadjutor bishops
Eduardo José Herberhold, O.F.M.  (1928-1931), as Coadjutor Prelate; did not succeed to see; appointed Bishop of Ilhéus, Bahia
Lino Vomboemmel, O.F.M. (1983-1985)

Auxiliary bishops
Lino Vomboemmel, O.F.M. (1981-1983), appointed Coadjutor here
Severino Batista de França, O.F.M. Cap. (2004-2007), appointed Bishop of Nazaré, Pernambuco

Other priest of this diocese who became bishop
Gilberto Pastana de Oliveira, appointed Bishop of Imperatriz, Maranhão in 2005

Ecclesiastical province
When it was raised to an Archdiocese, it was given three suffragans.

Diocese of Óbidos
Diocese of Xingu-Altamira
Territorial Prelature of Alto Xingu-Tucumã
Territorial Prelature of Itaituba

See also 
 List of Catholic dioceses in Brazil

References

Sources and external links 

 GCatholic.org, with Google map and satellite photo - data for all sections
 Catholic Hierarchy
 

Roman Catholic dioceses in Brazil
Religious organizations established in 1903
Roman Catholic dioceses and prelatures established in the 20th century